Story of Women is a 1988 French drama film directed by Claude Chabrol, based on the true story of Marie-Louise Giraud, guillotined on 30 July 1943 for having performed 27 abortions in the Cherbourg area, and the 1986 book Une affaire de femmes by Francis Szpiner.

The film premiered at the 45th Venice International Film Festival, in which Isabelle Huppert was awarded the prize for best actress. It has been cited as a favorite by filmmaker John Waters, who presented it as his annual selection within the 2008 Maryland Film Festival.

Plot
Under the German military administration in occupied France during World War II, Paul Latour is a prisoner of war in Germany and his wife Marie lives hand-to-mouth with their two children in a squalid flat. A neighbour, whose husband is also in Germany, has fallen pregnant and is trying to lose the baby. Marie helps her successfully. Other women come to her and she starts charging.

While talking with Paul following his release, she reveals that a fortune teller saw "nothing but good things" in her future, along with a lot of women, which she would not clarify. Marie confesses to wanting to be a famous singer. She has, however, lost her love for her husband, who has been wounded and struggles to stay in employment, and rejects his crude and abrupt sexual demands.

Although he cannot find work, he rents a bigger flat at her prompting. Marie continues her illicit business and lets prostitutes use their bedrooms during the day. When one of the abortions goes wrong, the woman dies and her despairing husband commits suicide. Marie shrugs off the tragedy and hires a maid to help. She visits a music teacher, who tells her that she has a great voice.

She also starts a daytime affair with a collaborator and offers the maid a pay raise if she sleeps with Paul. Paul is unhappy with this arrangement and, after he returns home early and witnesses Marie and her lover asleep together, he sends an anonymous denunciation to the police, alerting them to her illegal activities.

A recent law of the Vichy régime, determined to enforce morality and stop population decline, has made abortion a treasonable crime. Marie is condemned to death and guillotined.

Cast

Awards
In 1988, Isabelle Huppert won the Best Actress award at the Valladolid International Film Festival and the Volpi Cup at the Venice Film Festival. In 1989, the film won the Golden Precolumbian Circle at the Bogota Film Festival, the foreign film award at the Los Angeles Film Critics Association Awards (tied with Distant Voices, Still Lives), the Griffith Award for best foreign film by the National Board of Review and the best foreign-language film at the New York Film Critics Circle Awards. In 1990 it won the Sant Jordi Award, the Kansas City Film Critics Circle Award for Best Foreign Film and was nominated for a Golden Globe for Best Foreign Language Film. The film was ineligible for the Academy Award for Best Foreign Language Film as France had submitted Camille Claudel.

See also
 Isabelle Huppert on screen and stage
 1988 in film
 French films of 1988

References

External links
 
 

1988 films
1988 drama films
1980s feminist films
Abortion in France
Drama films based on actual events
Films about abortion
Films based on non-fiction books
Films directed by Claude Chabrol
Films produced by Marin Karmitz
Films set in the 1940s
French drama films
French feminist films
French films based on actual events
1980s French-language films
1980s French films